Mate Trojanović (20 May 1930 – 27 March 2015) was a Yugoslavian rower of Croat ethnicity, who won a gold medal in the coxless four event at the 1952 Summer Olympics. After completing his studies in veterinary medicine in Split he moved to Maribor, where he worked as a veterinary inspector with the Yugoslav federal customs.

References

1930 births
2015 deaths
Yugoslav male rowers
Croatian male rowers
Olympic rowers of Yugoslavia
Rowers at the 1952 Summer Olympics
Olympic gold medalists for Yugoslavia
Sportspeople from Metković
Olympic medalists in rowing
Medalists at the 1952 Summer Olympics